A ringmaster or ringmistress, or sometimes a ringleader, is a significant performer in many circuses. Most often seen in traditional circuses, the ringmaster is a master of ceremonies that introduces the circus acts to the audience. In smaller circuses, the ringmaster is often the owner and artistic director of the circus.

Duties and functions
A ringmaster introduces the various acts in a circus show and guides the audience through the experience, directing their attention to the various areas of the circus arena and helping to link the acts together while equipment is brought into and removed from the circus ring. A ringmaster may interact with some acts, especially the clown acts, to make the various acts part of a seamless circus performance. Ringmasters have become an integral part of the many circus shows and sometimes will be involved in elements of some of the acts performances. 

It is traditionally the ringmaster's job to use hyperbole whenever possible while introducing the acts to enhance the expectations of the audience. Declarations of the "biggest", "most dangerous", "amazing", "spectacular" and similar expressions are common.

Costume and attire
The traditional ringmaster costume consists of a bright tailcoat, often red with gold trim and with a waistcoat and a black top hat; occasionally with a bow tie, cravat, or stock tie. The outfit is designed to look as an 18th-century gentleman's riding habit, and often includes a whip, a relic of when the ringmaster directed the performance, not as an announcer and host, but as director of the many equestrian acts. It is generally accepted that this costume was first adopted by George Claude Lockhart on the orders of Bertram Mills in 1928, when Lockhart worked as ringmaster for his circus at Olympia, London.  A female circus leader is known as a ringmistress, and often wears a black skirt or leggings with knee-high black boots, and either the same style topcoat and tails as a ringmaster or a red blouse.

In non-English speaking countries, the ring master is known by different titles. In France, he is called "Monsieur Loyal" after the Anselme-Pierre Loyal (1753-1826), one of the first renowned circus personalities.

Early function and necessity 
The main function of a ringmaster was to direct the attention of the audience. In the days before modern lighting equipment and amplification, most acts performed mute, accompanied only by the circus' in house brass band. It was the ringmaster's loud voice that was necessary to cut through the noise, get the audiences attention and announce the next act.

Notable ringmasters 

Adolph Althoff
Norman Barrett
Tommy Hanlon Jr.
Johnathan Lee Iverson
George Claude Lockhart
George William Lockhart
P. T. Barnum
James Anthony Bailey
Henry Lytton Jr.

Records 
Norman Barrett has been noted by Guinness Word Records as holding the Guinness world record for the 'longest career as a ringmaster'.

References 

Entertainment occupations

Circus skills